Chuen Lung is a village in Tsuen Wan District, Hong Kong.

Administration
Chuen Lung is a recognized village under the New Territories Small House Policy.

History
Chuen Lung is one of the oldest Hakka villages in the area. It is said to have been founded by Tsang Tai-cheung during the Zhengtong period (1436-1449) of Ming Dynasty. Tsang Tai-cheung had moved, together with his two brothers, from Huizhou to Muk Min Ha Tsuen in today's Tsuen Wan area, during the Yongle period (1403-1424). He then moved to Chuen Lung several decades later.

Features
The Tsang Ancestral Hall in Chuen Lung is believed to have been built in around the 17th century. It is listed as a Grade III historic building.

References

External links

 Delineation of area of existing village Chuen Lung (Tsuen Wan) for election of resident representative (2019 to 2022)
 Antiquities Advisory Board. Pictures of Tsang Ancestral Hall

Villages in Tsuen Wan District, Hong Kong